MMAN may refer to:

Monomethylamine nitrate
Monomethylammonium nitrate
the ICAO code for Del Norte International Airport